Franklin Hiram King (8 June 1848 – 4 August 1911) was an American agricultural scientist who was born on a farm near Whitewater, Wisconsin, attended country schools, and received his professional training first at Whitewater State Normal School, graduating in 1872, and then at Cornell University. King is now best remembered for his first-hand account of traditional agricultural practices in Asia, now regarded as an organic farming classic text.

King served as a professor of agricultural physics at the University of Wisconsin–Madison from 1888 until 1902. Interested in a wide range of subjects throughout his career, King made major contributions during these years in research and teaching that dealt with applications of physics to agriculture. Most attention was given to soil physics, for example, water-holding capacities of soils, moisture requirements of plants, aeration, movement of water in soils, movement of groundwater, the drafts of plows, and the lifting power of windmills; he also began studies of soil fertility. The impact of his career was greatest in the field of soil science. He has been called the father of soil physics in the United States.

King left Wisconsin to become chief of the Division of Soil Management in the USDA Bureau of Soils in Washington, D.C. in January 1902. His findings in the next two years, that the concentration of nutrients in soil solution was correlated with crop yields, began to undermine beliefs held strongly by the chief of the bureau, Milton Whitney, about the relations of soil chemistry to plant growth and soil fertility. King was forced to resign but privately published several additional papers from his research during this period.

King returned to Madison, where he devoted the last seven years of his life to summarizing earlier findings and conducting further research in agricultural physics, including the ventilation of farm buildings. Three of his seven books were written during that period, the best known of which is Farmers of Forty Centuries, or Permanent Agriculture in China, Korea, and Japan, which recounted his investigations into what would now be called organic farming or sustainable agriculture during a nine-month tour of Asia in 1909. The last chapter was completed after his death, in 1911, by Carrie Baker King, his wife, who then published the book that same year. It has been described by Lord Northbourne—the founder of organic agriculture—as a "classic" which "no student of farming or social science can afford to ignore".

He is most popularly known for designing the cylindrical storage silo, which reduces the occurrence of spoilage in the silage.  Some have speculated that Frank Lloyd Wright's design of the Guggenheim Museum was influenced by King's designs. King is commemorated at the University of Wisconsin–Madison by King Hall, so renamed in 1934, which is the same Agricultural Physics Hall in which he worked during his tenure there and which now houses part of the Department of Soil Science (formed by the 1904 reorganization of King's original department into the 'Soils Department' and the 'Agricultural Engineering Department'), and by the F. H. King Students for Sustainable Agriculture, a student organization that grows various crops that are given away to community residents to raise awareness of sustainable farming and gardening.

Bibliography

In the Bulletin (University of Wisconsin. Agricultural Experiment Station)

In government publications
 
 
  11 plates.
 
 
  Milton Whitney, Chief of Bureau. 205 pages, 4 plates.

Encyclopedia Articles

Books 
  Abstract: "This is a collection of weed bulletins from many states at turn of century. F. H. King must have gathered & bound them."
  133 pages, 65 figures.
 
 
  176 illustrations.
 
 
  63 illustrations.
  246 illustrations, introduction by Dr. L. H. Bailey.

Other publications
  Bulletins E, F, and D. 168 pages. Includes a reprint from Science, N. S. Vol. XX, No. 514, pages 605–608, November 4, 1904, by E. W. Hilgard, a review of the above work.
 
  Largely an excerpt from Farmers of Forty Centuries.

Unpublished
  Illustrations are mounted photos. Includes indexes. Typed from notes taken in the field for the author's book, Farmers of forty centuries. Typescript note from author's wife mounted in both vols. Univ. California, Davis copy has spine title: Observations on China, Korea and Japan; title at head of note in v. 2: Observations in China, Korea and Japan. 2 volumes (591 leaves) : illustrations

References

External links 

 
 
 Publications in the Bulletin (University of Wisconsin. Agricultural Experiment Station)
 F. H. King documents from East Asia at Univ of Wisconsin–Madison
 King Hall, Univ of Wisconsin–Madison
 F. H. King Students for Sustainable Agriculture group at Univ of Wisconsin–Madison

1848 births
1911 deaths
American agronomists
American soil scientists
Cornell University alumni
Organic farmers